Luis Eduardo Soriano (born 8 March 1929) is a Dominican Republic sprinter. He competed in the men's 4 × 100 metres relay at the 1968 Summer Olympics.

References

External links
 

1929 births
Possibly living people
Athletes (track and field) at the 1955 Pan American Games
Athletes (track and field) at the 1968 Summer Olympics
Dominican Republic male sprinters
Olympic athletes of the Dominican Republic
Sportspeople from Santo Domingo
Pan American Games competitors for the Dominican Republic